The castles of Dahn (literally "Dahn castle group"), near the little town of Dahn in the German state of Rhineland-Palatinate, consist of three rock castles:
 Altdahn
 Grafendahn
 Tanstein

Geography 
The so-called Dahner Felsenland area of the Wasgau, the region forming the southern part of the Palatine Forest and the northern part of the Vosges, has a large number of castles and rock formations.

History 
The three castles were built next to one another, but not at the same time, utilizing five neighbouring rocks on a single ridge situated just under a kilometre east of Dahn. Their construction involved several generations of noble families from Dahn and lasted almost two centuries: Tanstein dates to the early 12th century; Altdahn to the early 13th century and Grafendahn to the late 13th century.

Similar castle groups 
A similar arrangement of two or three castles clustered closely together may be found in several places in the south part of neighbouring Alsatian Vosges: the Dreistein at Odilienberg near Obernai, the three castles on the Schlossberg near Reinhardsmunster, the Drei Exen near Eguisheim and the castle group of Haut-Kœnigsbourg/Oedenburg.

Literature

External links 

 Dahner Felsenland: Altdahn–Grafendahn–Tanstein
 Stefan Grathoff: Die Dahner Burgen und ihre Besitzer 

Rock castles
Castles in Rhineland-Palatinate
!
Heritage sites in Rhineland-Palatinate
Buildings and structures in Südwestpfalz